Judd Lander (born 1 March 1948) is an English harmonicist. Originally from Liverpool, Lander was previously a member of the band The Hideaways. He has experienced success as a prolific session musician, record industry executive, and company director.

Lander has played on hits such as Culture Club's "Karma Chameleon" as well as "Church of the Poison Mind" and the Spice Girls' hit "Say You'll Be There". He has played with many musicians including Paul McCartney, Annie Lennox, ABC and Madness.

Work as a Musician 
Lander was an intricate part of the late Mersey Beat scene, playing with well-known local band The Hideaways. The band were one of the first R&B groups in Liverpool and to this day hold the record for the most performances in the Cavern's history, surpassing The Beatles. In the mid 1960s Judd kindled a relationship with Sonny Boy Williamson II (Aleck Ford 'Rice' Miller) who taught Lander the intricacies of the Blues Harmonica. Landers playing technique became much in demand, his curiosity for the music industry led him to record label Charisma Records, whilst still retaining his status as a respected session musician.

His reputation as both a PR man & Session player grew and eventually, he was approached by Apple Records to help with John Lennon’s 75 release “Rock ‘n’ Roll Album. As a musician he was invited to perform on various in-house sessions with artists such as Billy Preston. Over the course of his career and directorships at various major labels, he has been instrumental in the careers of artists such ABBA, Michael Jackson, Nigel Dick and The Proclaimers. He was also responsible for breaking Meat Loaf in the UK, receiving a proclamation by the Mayor of the City Of Cleveland, Lander is also noted for persuading a rather recluse guitar icon Jeff Beck into doing  a TV interview with a bizarre result. Head hunted by RCA records to run their Motown UK Record division, Judd joined them at the historic Motown 25th anniversary show: ‘Yesterday, Today, Forever’.

Whilst at Motown Lander was called upon to a session at Red Bus Studios in London to lay down a harmonica part with a then relatively unknown band called Culture Club which led Lander to creating the now famous harmonica lead lines on their No 1 - million seller "Karma Chameleon" and "Church of the Poison Mind" with the release came a glut of TV and Wembley Stadium appearances. Around this period Lander was invited to join Paul McCartney on stage at The Odeon Hammersmith for a charity concert, and has since worked with Paul on his Flowers in the Dirt.

As a musician Judd is credited with performances on over 2000 recording sessions. He is noted for his work with artists such as The Beach Boys, Nazareth, The Proclaimers, Kirsty MacColl, Prefab Sprout, Maxi Priest, Madness, The The, Tina Turner, Mike Oldfield, The Communards, Richard Ashcroft, Annie Lennox. In addition to all this he now has an entry in  “Who’s Who In The Music Industry” and has received one of the highest musical accolades by receiving the Gold Award from BASCA ‘The British Academy of Songwriters, Composers and Authors’ held at London’s Savoy hotel. This coveted award celebrates the achievements of an outstanding group of people who have made a special contribution to Britain’s music industry. Judd was also involved in the biggest event in the UK music calendar The BRIT AWARDS. Judd had worked on this show for the past 22 years as floor Cam Director. Judd is now based in Hertfordshire just outside of London, where his office walls don an array of Gold and Platinum discs and awards, serving as a testament to the contribution he has given and still is making in the music business.

Work in Television 

Lander moved into the world of television as a puppeteer on BBC's Saturday Superstore kids show for a period of 5 years, then as an associated producer on The St Lucia Jazz Festival - shot in the Caribbean. His on-screen credits can also be seen in ‘Resting Rough’ an odd but amusing short film about a flea ridden mattress, which featured Pierce Brosnan – Judd composed arranged and produced the film's music. He also contributed to quite a few BBC drama episodes and headed the prestigious position as Director of promotions with London Records. His Chrysalis Records appointment saw him deliver the classic hit ‘The One and Only’ with Chesney Hawkes. Other shows include - Top of the Pops, The Tube, The Old Grey Whistle Test and Later... with Jools Holland.

He then went onto become A&R/label Director at Warner Music Group, a division within media giants Warner Bros. delivering them a No 2 and 3 top 40 chart single. Over the past 10 years he has successfully returned to his PR roots  - and with his indisputable wealth of media contacts he has already helped a host of international artists obtaining major TV media coverage - featuring artists such as LeAnn Rimes.

Partial discography
 1983: Bay City Rollers - Ricochet 
 1983: Culture Club - Colour by Numbers
 1984: Tracey Ullman - You Caught Me Out
 1984: Anthony Phillips - Private Parts and Pieces IV: A Catch at the Tables
1984: Bruce Foxton - Touch Sensitive
 1985: Madness - Mad Not Mad
 1985: Johnny Thunders - Que Sera Sera
 1985: The Beach Boys - The Beach Boys
 1986: Robbie Nevil - Robbie Nevil
 1986: The The - Infected
 1987: The Communards - Red
 1987: ABC - Alphabet City
 1988: Johnny Thunders and Patti Palladin – Copy Cats
 1989: Paul McCartney - Flowers in the Dirt
 1990: Prefab Sprout - Jordan: The Comeback
 1991: Kirsty MacColl - Electric Landlady
 1993: Helen Hoffner - Wild about Nothing
 1995: Annie Lennox - Medusa
 1996: Dina Carroll - Only Human
 1996: Spice Girls - Spice
 2000: Richard Ashcroft - Alone with Everybody

References

1948 births
Living people
British harmonica players
Musicians from Liverpool